The Order of battle of the Croisière du Grand Hiver lists the French forces involved in the Croisière du Grand Hiver during the French Revolutionary Wars.

Order of Battle

Notes and references

Notes

References

Bibliography 
 
  (1671-1870)
 
 Fonds Marine. Campagnes (opérations ; divisions et stations navales ; missions diverses). Inventaire de la sous-série Marine BB4. Tome premier : BB4 1 à 482 (1790-1826) 

French Revolutionary Wars orders of battle